The Golden Plains Shire is a local government area in Victoria, Australia, located in the western part of the state. It includes the towns of Bannockburn, Dereel, Gheringhap, Lethbridge, Linton, Berringa, Teesdale, Rokewood and Meredith.

The Shire was formed on 6 May 1994 by the amalgamation of the Shire of Bannockburn (the part remaining after part of it was amalgamated with several other councils to form the new City of Greater Geelong in May 1993), Shire of Leigh, part of the Shire of Grenville and part of the Shire of Buninyong. Upon its creation, it was known as the Southern Rural Shire, intended to exist temporarily until the Local Government Board drew up final council boundaries for the Ballarat region. However, a few months later it was decided to make the municipality permanent, and it was renamed to its current name on 1 October 1994.

The Shire is governed and administered by the Golden Plains Shire Council. Its seat of local government and administrative centre is located at the Golden Plains Civic Centre in Bannockburn, and it also has a service centre located in Smythesdale.

Council

Current composition
The council is composed of seven councillors elected to represent an unsubdivided municipality. The current councillors, in order of election at the 2022 election, are:

Administration and governance
The council meets on alternate months in the council chamber at the Golden Plains Civic Centre in Bannockburn, which is also the location of the council's administrative activities, and at the Linton Shire Hall. It also provides customer services at both its administrative centre in Bannockburn, and its service centre in Smythesdale.

Climate

Townships and localities
The 2021 census, the shire had a population of 24,985 up from 21,688 in the 2016 census

^ - Territory divided with another LGA

References

External links
Golden Plains Shire Council official website
Metlink local public transport map
Link to Land Victoria interactive maps

Local government areas of Victoria (Australia)
Grampians (region)